Persatuan Sepakbola Indonesia Lumajang or PSIL is an Indonesian football club based in Lumajang Regency, East Java that competes in Liga 3. Their nicknames are Laskar Wirabhumi and Walangkopo Bilok (The Flying Squirrel). They play their home matches at Semeru Stadium.

References

External links
 

Football clubs in Indonesia
Football clubs in East Java
Association football clubs established in 1947
1947 establishments in Indonesia